Philadelphia Military Academy (PMA) is a military school in North Philadelphia, Pennsylvania.  The school opened for the 2004–2005 school year as the Philadelphia Military Academy at Leeds in the Cedarbrook neighborhood of Philadelphia. The school opened with an enrollment of 157 ninth grade cadets. The academy was housed at the Leeds middle school. A second edition of the program was housed at Elverson High School in the 2005–2006 school year. This site is the current location of the school after a merger in the latter years. PMA is also known for earning their HUD aka honor unit with distinction directly from the army in 2022. After completing a service learning project and was rated 98%

Program
The academy is a special admission school. Like other military schools, students must adhere to the JROTC program. The academy is part of a growing trend, in Philadelphia and other cities, of military schools that are part of the public school system.

Students in the military academy wear uniforms every day and are always expected to observe military courtesy, including addressing their teachers with "sir" or "ma'am." However students are not obligated to enlist after graduation.

Building
The school is housed in the former James Elverson Jr. School building located in the Templetown neighborhood of Philadelphia, Pennsylvania. Designed by Irwin T. Catharine and built in 1929–1930, it is a three-story, 11 bay, brick building on a raised basement in the Late Gothic Revival-style. An addition was built in 1954. It features a projecting central entrance pavilion, brick piers, and a castellated parapet.  It was named for James Elverson, publisher of The Philadelphia Inquirer.

The building was added to the National Register of Historic Places in 1988.

References

External links
 

High schools in Philadelphia
Military high schools in the United States
Public high schools in Pennsylvania
2005 establishments in Pennsylvania
School buildings on the National Register of Historic Places in Philadelphia
Gothic Revival architecture in Pennsylvania
School buildings completed in 1930
Templetown, Philadelphia